Barbara Jeanne Anderson is an American retired actress. She is best known for her role as police officer Eve Whitfield on the television series Ironside (1967–1971), which earned her a Primetime Emmy Award.

Early life
Anderson was born in Brooklyn, New York. Her father, George Anderson, was a Navy enlisted man. She spent her early years in New York City, but during her teenage years, she resided in Memphis, Tennessee, where her parents had moved.

Anderson became interested in acting during her teens, when she did a Tennessee Williams play. While she was a student at Memphis State University, Anderson won the title of Miss Memphis in 1963. Anderson was an actress with the Front Street Repertory Theatre, and debuted professionally in Memphis with the Southwestern University Players. Later, she acted with the Los Angeles Art Theatre.

Television
Anderson decided to move to Los Angeles. In 1966, one of her first TV appearances came in a first-season episode of Star Trek, "The Conscience of the King".

She premiered her Eve Whitfield character in the March 1967 Ironside TV movie, and continued the role when the series debuted in September. That same week in September, she had a featured role in the first episode of the TV series Mannix.

Anderson was one of the four original cast members of Ironside and was the lead actress in the series for the first 105 episodes. Anderson played the role of one of two police officers chosen to assist Robert Ironside (Raymond Burr), former chief of detectives for San Francisco, after he lost the use of his legs due to a shooting. Anderson continued in her role as Officer Whitfield for four seasons. For her role on the show, she won the Primetime Emmy Award for Outstanding Supporting Actress in a Drama Series in 1968.

Her later performances include the wife of a man who inherits a notoriously haunted house in the Night Gallery episode "Fright Night" and as a witness to a mob hit in the Harry O episode "Material Witness". She accepted a recurring role (seven episodes) in the final season of Mission Impossible.

In 1971, Anderson left Ironside, and full-time TV acting, to spend more time with her husband. She did continue to work, though, accepting supporting roles in several TV movies, including the 1973 pilot film for The Six Million Dollar Man, the cult horror TV classic Don't Be Afraid of the Dark (where she played Kim Darby's best friend Joan Kahn), and 1977's You Lie So Deep, My Love (where she was reunited with former Ironside co-star Don Galloway). She also accepted guest roles on popular TV shows of the period including The Love Boat, Wonder Woman, and Marcus Welby, M.D.. In 1993, Anderson reunited with her former Ironside co-stars for the TV movie Return of Ironside, reprising her role as Eve Whitfield, now the mother of a daughter. After this role, Anderson retired from acting permanently.

Personal life
In 1971, Anderson married actor Don Burnett and left the TV series Ironside to devote time to her marriage.

Filmography

Awards and nominations

References

External links 
 
 

20th-century American actresses
Actresses from Memphis, Tennessee
Actresses from New York City
American beauty pageant winners
American film actresses
American television actresses
Living people
People from Brooklyn
Outstanding Performance by a Supporting Actress in a Drama Series Primetime Emmy Award winners
21st-century American women
Year of birth missing (living people)